A Fool Who'll is the third album by Australian folk singer-songwriter Laura Jean. It was released on 29 August 2011 via Chapter Music.

Reception 

Samantha Allemann for ArtsHub Australia, rated A Fool Who'll as five-out-of-five stars and explained, "[it] succeeds in putting together nine songs which are interestingly diverse, yet all equally strong. There's no filler, and that is something quite rare indeed. Laura Jean's gorgeous voice and strong range is well matched by her band and their new electric approach, resulting in an album that's both dynamic and sweet."

The Sydney Morning Heralds Bernard Zuel noticed that Jean, "does not fear intimacy", as the album is, "dominated by the mix of emotion that comes with falling in love." She shows, "The thrill of love is definitely there... but so is its travelling partner in any love affair: the fear of losing that love."

Melbourne's radio station 3RRR's staff listed it as their Album of the Week on 29 August 2011, with the summary, "[it] offers the understated but captivating style of previous recordings, and imbues its songs with elements of disquiet, and dissonance... [it] reflects an evolution in [her] sound and approach. Incorporating new sounds."

Track listing

(All tracks by Laura Jean Englert)
 "So Happy" – 3:32
 "Missing You"  – 4:54
 "Valenteen"   – 4:06
 "Noël" – 5:30
 "Spring" – 6:13
 "Marry Me" – 5:34
 "Australia"  – 5:36
 "My Song"   – 4:00
 "All Along"  – 4:52

Personnel

Laura Jean Trio
 Biddy Connor – viola, piano accordion, Casio SK1, vocals, string arrangements ("Spring", "My Song")
 Laura Jean Englert – vocals, guitars (acoustic, bass, electric), saxophone
 Jen Sholakis – drums, guitars (acoustic, electric), vocals

Additional musicians
 Zoe Barry – cello ("Spring", "Marry Me", "My Song")
 Isobel Knowles – trumpet ("Australia")
 Martin Mackerras – clarinet ("Valenteen", "Marry Me")
 Paddy Mann – vocals ("Spring")
 Steph O'Hara – violin ("Spring", "Marry Me", "My Song")
 Jojo Petrina – vocals ("My Song")
 Monica Sonand  – vocals ("My Song")
 Andrea Sumner – violin ("Noël", "All Along")

Recording details
 Simon Grounds – producer, audio engineer; at Headgap and Dollhouse studios
 Peter J Moore – mastering
 Darryl Neudorf – mixer at Operation Northwoods studio

Art works
 Laura Jean Englert – design
 Isobel Knowles – design
 Karl Scullin – photography, design

References

2011 albums
Laura Jean albums